ARMO oil refiner is one of the two oil refiners in Albania.  It owns oil refineries at Ballsh and Fier, research center, 11 depots, a small network of fuel stations, and the Vlorë Terminal located in the south coast on Adriatic sea.  The CEO of Armo Energy is Rezart Taci. Mr. Taci is also the head of Taçi Oil

The Ballsh refinery is the largest refinery in Albania and has a designed capacity 1 million tonnes per year. Fier refinery has a capacity of 500 thousand tonnes per year and is designed mainly to produce bitumen.

In 2008, 85% of ARMO shares was sold to the U.S-Swiss consortium Refinery Associates of Texas and Anika Enterprises SA (other companies were involved in initial talks, but did not participate in the purchase)  for €128.7 million. Other bids were made by Petrofac, Penta Investments and Vitol.

As of the fall of 2012, ARMO Energy employs over 1,500 people and has a refining capacity of 1.5 million tons with a storage capacity of 220,000 cubic meters.

References

Oil companies of Albania
Oil refineries in Albania
Buildings and structures in Mallakastër
Buildings and structures in Fier